The 2018 Florida A&M Rattlers football team represented Florida A&M University in the 2018 NCAA Division I FCS football season. The Rattlers were led by first-year head coach Willie Simmons. They played their home games at Bragg Memorial Stadium. They were a member of the Mid-Eastern Athletic Conference. They finished the season 6–5, 5–2 in MEAC play to finish in a tie for second place.

Previous season
The Rattlers finished the 2017 season 3–8, 2–6 in MEAC play to finish in a three-way tie for eighth place.

On November 20, head coach Alex Wood resigned. He finished at Florida A&M with a three-year record of 8–25.

Preseason

MEAC preseason poll
In a vote of the MEAC head coaches and sports information directors, the Rattlers were picked to finish in fifth place.

Preseason All-MEAC Teams
The Rattlers had ten players selected to the preseason all-MEAC teams.

Offense

2nd team

Devin Bowers – RB

Loubens Polinice – OL

3rd team

Ryan Stanley – QB

Obinna Nwankwo – OL

Khalil Harris – OL

Defense

2nd team

Antonio Miller – DL

Jabireel Hazly – LB

Olrando McKinley – DB

Terry Jefferson – DB

Special teams

2nd team

Chris Fabboul – P

Schedule

 Source: Schedule

Game summaries

Fort Valley State

at Troy

Jackson State

Savannah State

at North Carolina Central

Norfolk State

at North Carolina A&T

Morgan State

at Howard

South Carolina State

vs Bethune–Cookman

Coaching staff

References

Florida AandM
Florida A&M Rattlers football seasons
Florida AandM football